Charles Edward Durning (February 28, 1923 – December 24, 2012) was an American actor who appeared in over 200 movies, television shows and plays. Durning's best-known films include The Sting (1973), Dog Day Afternoon (1975), The Muppet Movie (1979), True Confessions (1981), Tootsie (1982), Dick Tracy (1990), and O Brother, Where Art Thou? (2000). He was nominated for the Academy Award for Best Supporting Actor for both The Best Little Whorehouse in Texas (1982) and To Be or Not to Be (1983). Prior to his acting career, Durning served in World War II and was decorated for valor in combat.

Early life
Durning was born in Highland Falls, New York. He was the son of Louise (née Leonard; 1894–1982), a laundress at West Point, and James E. Durning (1883 – c. 1935). His parents were of German, Irish and English descent Durning was raised Catholic.  Durning was the ninth of ten children. His three brothers – James (known as Roger, 1915–2000), Clifford (1916–1994), and Gerald (1926–2000) – and his sister Frances (1918–2006) survived to adulthood, but five sisters died from scarlet fever and smallpox as children.

Military service
Durning served in the U.S. Army during World War II. He was drafted at age 20. On June 6, 1944, Durning was assigned to the 1st Infantry Division and was in one of the first waves of American troops that landed on Omaha Beach during the D-Day invasion of Normandy. After being wounded by a German anti-personnel mine in the Bocage, he spent six months recovering. Durning was reassigned to the 398th Infantry Regiment with the 100th Infantry Division, and participated in the Battle of the Bulge in December 1944. He was discharged with the rank of private first class on January 30, 1946.

For his valor and the wounds he received during the war, Durning was awarded the Silver Star, Bronze Star, and three Purple Hearts. Additional awards included the Army Good Conduct Medal, the American Campaign Medal and the European-African-Middle Eastern Campaign Medal with Arrowhead device and two bronze service stars, and the World War II Victory Medal. His badges included the Combat Infantryman Badge, Expert Badge with Rifle Bar, and Honorable Service Lapel Pin.

Durning received the French National Order of the Legion of Honor from the French Consul in Los Angeles in April 2008.

Veteran groups and spokesman
Durning participated in various functions to honor American veterans, including serving as Chairman of the U.S. National Salute to Hospitalized Veterans. He was an honored guest speaker for 17 years at the National Memorial Day Concert televised by PBS every year on the Sunday evening of Memorial Day weekend.

Durning was paid a special tribute at the May 26, 2013, National Memorial Day Concert when "Taps" was sounded in his honor.

Acting career

While pursuing an acting career, Durning, a professional ballroom dancer, taught at Fred Astaire Dance Studio in New York City.

Durning began his career in 1951. While working as an usher in a burlesque theatre, he was hired to replace a drunken actor on stage. Subsequently, he performed in roughly 50 stock company productions and in various off-Broadway plays, eventually attracting the attention of Joseph Papp, founder of The Public Theater and the New York Shakespeare Festival.  Beginning in 1961, he appeared in 35 plays as part of the Shakespeare Festival. "That time in my life was my best time," Durning told Pittsburgh's Post Gazette in 2001. "I had no money at all, and he [Joseph Papp] didn't pay much. You were getting a salary for performance plus a rehearsal salary. We would do three plays in Central Park for the summer. And then you'd do three to six plays every year down on Lafayette Street – new plays by new writers: Sam Shepard, David Mamet, David Rabe, John Ford Noonan, Jason Miller."

During this period, he segued into television and movies. He made his film debut in 1965, appearing in Harvey Middleman, Fireman. He appeared in John Frankenheimer's I Walk the Line (1970) starring Gregory Peck, and three Brian De Palma movies: Hi, Mom! (1970, as Charles Durnham), Sisters (1973), and The Fury (1978). He also appeared in Dealing: or the Berkeley-to-Boston Forty-Brick Lost-Bag Blues (1972) with Barbara Hershey and John Lithgow.

Durning's performances in Broadway productions include Drat! The Cat! (1965), Pousse-Café (1966), The Happy Time (1968), Indians (1969), That Championship Season (1972), In the Boom Boom Room (1973), The Au Pair Man (1973), Knock Knock (1976), Cat on a Hot Tin Roof (1990), Inherit the Wind (1996), The Gin Game (1997), and The Best Man (2000).

In 2002, he performed in Bertolt Brecht's The Resistible Rise of Arturo Ui with Al Pacino, produced by Tony Randall. He played the role of Jack Jameson in Wendy Wasserstein's final play, Third (2005), with Dianne Wiest at Lincoln Center's Mitzi E. Newhouse Theatre.

Durning won the Los Angeles Drama Critics Circle Award for his powerful performance in The Westwood Playhouse's 1977 production of David Rabe's Streamers. In 1980, he won critical acclaim for his performance as Norman Thayer, Jr. in Los Angeles's Ahmanson Theater's production of On Golden Pond opposite Julie Harris.

In 1972, director George Roy Hill, impressed by Durning's performance in the Tony Award- and Pulitzer Prize-winning play That Championship Season, offered him a role in The Sting (1973). In the Best Picture-winner, starring Paul Newman and Robert Redford, Durning won distinction as a crooked cop, Lt. Wm. Snyder, who polices and hustles professional con artists. He doggedly pursues the young grifter, Johnny Hooker (Redford), only to become the griftee in the end. Other film credits include Dog Day Afternoon with Al Pacino; When A Stranger Calls; The Final Countdown; The Hindenburg; Twilight's Last Gleaming with Burt Lancaster; True Confessions with Robert De Niro and Robert Duvall. Some television credits include The Connection; Queen of the Stardust Ballroom, the made-for-television musical in which he played the mailman who reaches out to Maureen Stapleton's lonely widow on the dance floor; Attica; PBS's Dancing Bear with Tyne Daly; the PBS production I Would Be Called John as Pope John XXIII; Hallmark Hall of Fame: Casey Stengel, in which Durning played the legendary baseball manager Charles Dillon "Casey" Stengel; NBC's mini-series Studs Lonigan with Harry Hamlin and Colleen Dewhurst; The Best Little Girl in the World with Jennifer Jason Leigh. In 1976, he received both an Emmy and a Golden Globe nomination for his performance in the television mini-series Captains and the Kings.

In 1979, he played Doc Hopper, a man who owns a frog leg restaurant and the main antagonist in The Muppet Movie. In Tootsie, he played a suitor to Dustin Hoffman's cross-dressing lead character. The two actors worked together again in a 1985 TV production of Death of a Salesman.

In 1993, he guest-starred in the Sean Penn-directed music video "Dance with the One That Brought You" by Shania Twain.

Other film roles include Henry Larson, the benevolent father of Holly Hunter's character in Home for the Holidays (1995) and Waring Hudsucker in The Hudsucker Proxy (1994).  He worked with the Coen Brothers again playing "Pappy" O'Daniel, a cynical governor of Mississippi (a character loosely based on the Texas politician and showman W. Lee O'Daniel) in the Coen Brothers' O Brother, Where Art Thou? (2000).

Prior to appearing in the Burt Reynolds's TV series, Evening Shade, as the town doctor Harlan Eldridge (1990–1994), Durning appeared with Reynolds in five films, beginning with 1979's Starting Over, followed by 1981's Sharky's Machine, 1982's Best Little Whorehouse in Texas, 1985's Stick and 1999's Hostage Hotel.

On TV, Durning had a recurring role on Everybody Loves Raymond as the Barone family's long-suffering parish priest, Father Hubley. He also played the voice of recurring character Francis Griffin, the religious zealot father of Peter in the animated series Family Guy. He appeared on the FX television series Rescue Me, playing Mike Gavin, the retired firefighter father of Denis Leary's character.

In 2005, he was nominated for an Emmy Award for his portrayal of a Marine veteran in "Call of Silence," an episode in the television series NCIS, first broadcast November 23, 2004. Durning's character turns himself in to authorities, insisting that he must be prosecuted for having murdered his buddy during ferocious combat on Iwo Jima six decades earlier. The real truth of the incident only becomes known for certain when the guilt-stricken veteran goes through a cathartic reliving of the battlefield events.

For his numerous roles on television, he earned nine Emmy Award nominations. He also received Academy Award for Best Supporting Actor nominations for The Best Little Whorehouse in Texas in 1982 and To Be or Not to Be in 1983. He won a Golden Globe in 1990 for his supporting role in the television miniseries The Kennedys of Massachusetts, having had three previous nominations. That same year, he won a Tony Award for his performance as Big Daddy in Cat on a Hot Tin Roof. He received two Drama Desk Awards for his performances in That Championship Season and Third.

In 1999, Durning was inducted into the Theater Hall of Fame on Broadway. He was honored with the Life Achievement Award at the 14th Annual Screen Actors Guild Award Ceremony on January 27, 2008. On July 31, 2008, he was given a star on the Hollywood Walk of Fame adjacent to one of his idols, James Cagney.

"There are many secrets in us, in the depths of our souls, that we don't want anyone to know about," he told Parade. "There's terror and repulsion in us, the terrible spot that we don't talk about. That place that no one knows about — horrifying things we keep secret. A lot of that is released through acting."

The Charles Durning Collection is held at the Academy Film Archive. Along with films he appeared in, his collection consists mainly of films he admired as well as a small collection of family home movies.

Death

Durning died of natural causes at his home in Manhattan on Christmas Eve December 24, 2012, aged 89. He was buried at Arlington National Cemetery.

On December 27, 2012, Broadway theaters dimmed their lights to honor him. The New York Times, which commented on Durning's more than 200 credited roles, referred to him and actor Jack Klugman, who died the same day, as "extraordinary actors ennobling the ordinary". The Huffington Post compared the two men, calling them "character actor titans".

Personal life
Durning married his first wife, Carole Doughty, in 1959. They had three children together before divorcing in 1972. Durning married his second wife, Mary Ann Amelio, in 1974. In 2010, the two filed an official Declaration of Separation.

Filmography

Stage credits

Television

Narrations
 Normandy: The Great Crusade Discovery Channel Director-Christopher Koch – English (1994)

References

External links

 
 
 
 
 Arlington National Cemetery
 
 Hayes, Richard L., Osprey Publishing. "Hollywood Stars at D-Day"
 Soldiers Online – Army.mil. "Concert on Memorial Day"

1923 births
2012 deaths
20th-century American male actors
21st-century American male actors
American male comedy actors
American male film actors
American male musical theatre actors
American male stage actors
American male television actors
American male voice actors
American people of English descent
American people of German descent
American people of Irish descent
Best Supporting Actor Golden Globe (television) winners
Burials at Arlington National Cemetery
Catholics from New York (state)
Male actors from New York (state)
People from Highlands, New York
Recipients of the Legion of Honour
Recipients of the Silver Star
Tony Award winners
United States Army personnel of World War II
United States Army soldiers
Landmine victims